Sir William Duncan Geddis (9 July 1896 – 12 December 1971) was a unionist politician in Northern Ireland.

Geddis studied at Skerries College in Belfast before becoming a clothing manufacturer. He served in the Royal Army Ordnance Corps from 1940 to 1948, retiring with the rank of Major.

He was elected to the Belfast Corporation for the Ulster Unionist Party and served as Lord Mayor of Belfast from 1966 to 1969. He was knighted in 1969.

References

1896 births
1971 deaths
High Sheriffs of Belfast
Members of the Senate of Northern Ireland 1965–1969
Lord Mayors of Belfast
Ulster Unionist Party members of the Senate of Northern Ireland
Knights Bachelor
Politicians awarded knighthoods
Royal Army Ordnance Corps officers